Limonium virgatum is a species of plants in the family Plumbaginaceae (leadworts). Individuals can grow to 17 cm tall.

Sources

References 

virgatum
Flora of Malta